The eighth season of Teenage Mutant Ninja Turtles aired in 1994. From this point onwards, the show was retooled into a more action-based series. Among the changes, the tone of the show became darker and more serious, the art style changed significantly, and many of the previous notable characters were written out. There was also a new title sequence which added in clips from the first live-action film and stills from the first four episodes of season 8, and a completely new theme song. These final three seasons are known as the "Red Sky episodes" amongst fans, because the sky was constantly portrayed as red, instead of the usual blue, complementing the overall darker tone. The Technodrome is now in Dimension X, while Krang, Shredder, Bebop and Rocksteady are stranded on Earth.

Episodes
 All eight eighth-season episodes were directed by Tony Love and written by David Wise.

References

External links
TV Com

Teenage Mutant Ninja Turtles (1987 TV series) seasons
1994 American television seasons
Fiction about black holes